Ajithana Sahasagalu was a Kannada language detective teleserial that aired on DD Kannada in the early 1990s. The serial was based on Arthur Conan Doyle detective stories.

References

Kannada-language television shows